Don Athaldo (26 November 1894 – 24 May 1965) was a strongman.

Biography
He was born as Walter Joseph Lyons on 26 November 1894 in Condobolin, New South Wales to Frederick Horace George Lyons and Elizabeth Power. Elizabeth died of tuberculosis after his birth. He was a sickly child and later saw the strongman Dr. Gordon at Fitzgerald Bros' Circus and decided to bulk up.

References

1894 births
1965 deaths
Australian strength athletes